NBR may refer to:

Rail 
 New Brunswick Railway, a former Canadian railway company absorbed by the Canadian Pacific Railway
 North Bay Railway, a light-railway system for tourists in Scarborough, North Yorkshire
 North British Railway (1844–1923), a former Scottish railway company absorbed by London and North Eastern Railway

Media 
 National Board of Review, an American film review organization
 National Business Review, a weekly New Zealand newspaper aimed at the business sector
 Nightly Business Report, an American business and economic television news program

Other uses 
 Nabors Industries (NYSE symbol), an oil, natural gas and geothermal drilling contractor
 National Bison Range, a National Wildlife Refuge, Montana, United States
 National Buildings Record (1940–1963), an archive of historic building information in England
 National Board of Revenue is the central authority for tax administration in Bangladesh
 National Bureau of Asian Research, an American research institution for Asia-Pacific policy
 Nitrile butadiene rubber, an oil-resistant synthetic rubber copolymer
 Non-blanching rash, a type of skin rash
 Norma Brasileira Regulamentadora, Brazilian National Standard by the Brazilian National Standards Organization